Betrayal is a 1981 Norwegian drama film directed by Vibeke Løkkeberg, starring Løkkeberg and Helge Jordal.

Betrayal is set in Bergen in the year 1948. The film's protagonist is the seven-year-old Kamilla (Knapskog), who grows up in a society under reconstruction, and in a family in disintegration. Her parents are mostly concerned about money and about themselves, but in her friend Svein (Johansen) Kamilla finds the love and solidarity that she is missing.

External links
 
 Løperjenten at Filmweb.no (Norwegian)
 Betrayal at the Norwegian Film Institute

1981 films
1981 drama films
Films directed by Vibeke Løkkeberg
Norwegian drama films
1980s Norwegian-language films